Wyspa dzieci (English: The Island of Children) is the second studio album by Polish group 2 Plus 1, released in 1975 by Polskie Nagrania Muza. The LP was a concept album, telling about problems of children and teenagers. The album included a number of hit songs: "Kołysanka matki", "Na luzie" and "Gwiazda dnia", the latter recorded for the 1973 film In Desert and Wilderness. The album was re-released on CD in 2001.

Track listing 
Side A:
 "Wyspa dzieci" ("The Island of Children") – 4:05
 "Gdzieś w sercu na dnie" ("Somewhere at the Bottom of Your Heart") – 2:35
 "Kołysanka matki" ("The Mother's Lullaby") – 4:45
 "Coraz bliżej dom" ("We're Coming Home") – 3:25
 "Na luzie" ("Take It Easy") – 3:20

Side B:
 "Bez pieniędzy" ("Without Money") – 3:50
 "Na naszym piętrze nowina" ("There's the News on Our Storey") – 4:00
 "A my jak dzieci" ("We're Like Children") – 3:30
 "Song rodziców" ("Parents' Song") – 2:45
 "Setki mil" ("Hundreds of Miles") – 3:00
 "Gwiazda dnia" ("The Star of the Day") – 1:50

External links 
 Wyspa dzieci on Discogs

References 

1975 albums
2 Plus 1 albums
Concept albums
Polish-language albums